Chromium(VI) peroxide or chromium oxide peroxide is an unstable compound with the formula CrO5. This compound contains one oxo ligand and two peroxo ligands, making a total of five oxygen atoms per chromium atom.

Preparation and properties
Chromium(VI) peroxide is formed by the addition of acidified hydrogen peroxide solutions to solutions of metal chromates or dichromates, such as sodium chromate or potassium dichromate. The generally yellow chromates or orange dichromates turn to dark blue as chromium(VI) peroxide is formed. Chromate or dichromate reacts with hydrogen peroxide and an acid to give chromium peroxide and water.

CrO42− + 2 H2O2 + 2 H+ → CrO5 + 3 H2O

With this method, the chromium(VI) peroxide will decompose after a few seconds, turning green as chromium(III) compounds are formed. 

2 CrO5 + 7 H2O2 + 6 H+ → 2 Cr3+ + 10 H2O + 7 O2

To avoid this decomposition, it is possible to stabilize chromium(VI) oxide peroxide in water-immiscible organic solvents such as diethyl ether, butan-1-ol or amyl acetate by adding a layer of the organic solvent above the chromate/dichromate solution and shaking during the addition of hydrogen peroxide. In this way, the chromium(VI) peroxide (unstable in the aqueous phase in which it is newly formed) is dissolved in the immiscible organic solvent. In this condition, it can be observed over a much longer period.

CrO5 is unstable and decomposes on standing to form CrO3. It is incompatible with ketones and primary alcohols, as it oxidizes them to aldehydes and carboxylic acids while being itself reduced to Cr3+. Therefore, CrO5 is a good oxidizing agent, even better than chromates and dichromates due to the presence of two reactive peroxo ligands, but due to its low stability it is not used in organic syntheses.

Derivatives

The etherate, bipyridyl and pyridyl complexes of this compound have been found to be effective oxidants in organic chemistry. The structure of the pyridyl complex has been determined crystallographically.

Gallery

See also 

 Tetraperoxochromate - an similarly-synthesized analogous chromium(V) peroxide complex

References

External links
Experimental details and photo 
 (8 November 2012). Professor Martyn Poliakoff of the University of Nottingham demonstrates the synthesis on Periodic Videos.

Peroxides
Chromates
Transition metal oxides